Sagrai is a village in Khandaghosh CD block in Bardhaman Sadar South subdivision of Purba Bardhaman district in the state of West Bengal, India.

Geography

Urbanisation
95.54% of the population of Bardhaman Sadar South subdivision live in the rural areas. Only 4.46% of the population live in the urban areas, and that is the lowest proportion of urban population amongst the four subdivisions in Purba Bardhaman district. The map alongside presents some of the notable locations in the subdivision. All places marked in the map are linked in the larger full screen map.

CD block HQ
The headquarters of Khandaghosh CD block are located at Sagrai.

Demographics
As per the 2011 Census of India Sagrai had a total population of 1,755, of which 877 (50%) were males and 878 (50%) were females. Population below 6 years was 155. The total number of literates in Sagrai was 1,385 (86.56% of the population over 6 years).

Transport
The State Highway 7, running from Rajgram (in Murshidabad district) to Midnapore (in Paschim Medinipur district), passes through Sagrai.

Education
Sagrai Sukanta Vidyapith is a Bengali-medium coeducational higher secondary school. Established in 2003, it has facilities for teaching in classes VI to XII.

Primary schools in Sagrai: Ahladipur FP School and Keudia Latifpur FP School.

References

Villages in Purba Bardhaman district